The Croker River is a waterway above the Arctic Circle on the mainland of Northern Canada in the western Kitikmeot Region, Nunavut. It is the largest river between Darnley Bay (in the Northwest Territories) and Coronation Gulf that flows into Amundsen Gulf. The Croker averages  in width.

It originates at Bluenose Lake then flows northward.

Croker River is named after John Wilson Croker, Secretary to the Admiralty.

Croker River (PIN 1BG) is a former Distant Early Warning Line and a current North Warning System site.

See also
List of rivers of Nunavut

References

Rivers of Kitikmeot Region
Former populated places in the Kitikmeot Region